The 2013 FIBA U16 European Championship Division C was held in Gibraltar, from 2 to 7 July 2013. Five teams participated in the competition.

Participating teams
 
 (hosts)

Standings

2012–13 in European basketball
FIBA Europe Under-16 Championship
July 2013 sports events in Europe
FIBA U16 European Championship Division C